Hits & Ballads is a double disc compilation album released by Richard Marx exclusively in Taiwan, featuring several songs spanning his career, a few new songs, and one cover. It is his ninth overall compilation album, and second double disc compilation album.

Track listing
Disc 1
Right Here Waiting
Hazard
Should've Known Better
Endless Summer Nights
Angelia
Children of the Night
Now And Forever
Slipping Away
Don't Mean Nothing
Can't Help Falling In Love
Hold On To The Nights
Keep Coming Back
Heaven Only Knows
Take This Heart
Until I Find You Again
Chains Around My Heart
Thanks To You

Disc 2
This I Promise You
Hazard (Acoustic)
Endless Summer Nights (Acoustic)
Now And Forever (Acoustic)
To Where You Are (Acoustic)
The Best Of Me (Acoustic)
Right Here Waiting (Acoustic)

2010 greatest hits albums
Albums produced by Richard Marx
Richard Marx albums